These are the complete results achieved by Honda cars and engines in Formula One.

Formula One World Championship results

As a constructor

Works entries
(key)

Notes
† – Driver failed to finish the race, but was classified as they had completed greater than 90% of the race distance.

Non-works entries
(key)

As an engine supplier

1983–1992
(key)

2000–2008
(key)

2015–2021
(key)

As Honda RBPT (2023–2025)
(key)

Notes

† – Driver failed to finish the race, but was classified as they had completed greater than 90% of the race distance.
‡ – Half points awarded as less than 75% of the race distance was completed.

Non-championship Formula One results
(key)

Notes

References 

Formula One constructor results
Honda in motorsport
results